The 2003 Memphis Tigers football team represented the University of Memphis in the 2003 NCAA Division I-A football season. Memphis competed as a member of the Conference USA.  The team was led by head coach Tommy West. The Tigers played their home games at the Liberty Bowl Memorial Stadium.

Schedule

Roster

References

Memphis
Memphis Tigers football seasons
New Orleans Bowl champion seasons
Memphis Tigers football